Kotes may refer to:
 Kotes (surname), a Slovak and Czech surname
 Kotes, Gandusari, Blitar, a village on the island of Java

See also 
 Cotes (disambiguation)